Pir Karam Ali Shah (c. 1934 – 4 August 2020) was a Pakistani politician who served as governor of Gilgit-Baltistan. He was appointed governor on January 26, 2011, by President of Pakistan, Asif Ali Zardari.

He was succeeded by Governor Chaudhry Muhammad Barjees Tahir, who took office on 16 February 2015. Pir Syed Karam Ali Shah hailed from Kuchdeh valley (Shahi Dour) which is located in Tehsil Ishkoman Valley which is approx 120 km away from Gilgit-Baltistan city.

See also 
 List of Governors of Pakistan

References 

Governors of Gilgit-Baltistan
People from Gilgit-Baltistan
1934 births
Pakistan People's Party politicians
2020 deaths